Basic element is a term in algebra.

Basic Element may refer to:
Basic Element (company)
Basic Element (music group)

See also 
 Element (disambiguation)